BFZ may refer to

Blanco Fracture Zone off the coast of Oregon, United States
Brawley Fault Zone near the Salton Sea in Southern California, United States
Brothers Fault Zone in the state of Oregon, United States